Nakla is an upazila of Sherpur District in the Division of Mymensingh, Bangladesh.

Geography

It had 33,482 units of household and total area 174.8 km2.

The Nakla was freed from Pakistani military on 9 December 1971. Pakistani military forces surrendered in the village named Pathakata. It is a historical place for Nakla. Every day many of tourists who are interested in its liberation war come to see the place. Nowadays there is a market named Pathakata Baazar.

Nakla is the major upazila of Sherpur district. Many famous persons were born there.

Demographics
As of the 1991 Bangladesh census, Nakla had a population of 162952. Males constituted 51.03% of the population, and females 48.97%. This Upazila's eighteen up population was 81345. Nakla had an average literacy rate of 22.4% (7+ years), and the national average of 32.4% literate.

Administration
Nakla Thana, now an upazila, was formed in 1930.

Nakla Upazila is divided into Nakla Municipality and nine union parishads: Baneshwardi, Chandrakona, Char Ashtadhar, Ganapaddi, Kursa Badagair, Nakla, Pathakata, Talki, and Urpha. The union parishads are subdivided into 88 mauzas and 108 villages.

Nakla Municipality is subdivided into 9 wards and 16 mahallas.

See also
Upazilas of Bangladesh
Districts of Bangladesh
Divisions of Bangladesh

References

Upazilas of Sherpur District